Blakesley was a railway station on the Stratford-upon-Avon and Midland Junction Railway (SMJ) which served the Northamptonshire village of Blakesley between 1873 and 1962. It was linked to nearby Blakesley Hall by a miniature railway which ran from a terminal adjacent to the station.

History 
A line from Greens Norton junction near  to Stratford-upon-Avon and the junction with the Great Western Railway's Honeybourne branch line was first authorised in June 1864, but due to a lack of funds it took a further nine years for the line, built by the East and West Junction Railway, to be fully open to traffic. A station was opened at Blakesley, a Northamptonshire village  from Blisworth, with two platforms enclosing the running line as well as a loop line which also served as a goods siding. A signal box was located between the east end of the down platform and the loading dock, and to the west a road overbridge carried Blakesley High Street over the line. The station buildings, a one-storey brick building, were demolished by 1952 leaving the station as little more than a halt. Passenger services were withdrawn later that year, with goods continuing for a further ten years.

Blakesley station was linked to nearby Blakesley Hall by the  gauge Blakesley Miniature Railway which ran from a terminal located to the west of the station at the rear of the down platform. It was opened in 1903 by the owner of Blakesley Hall, Charles Bartholomew, a Yorkshire colliery owner and shareholder in the East and West Junction Railway. Two Cagney 4-4-0 locomotives and rolling stock were obtained from the United States. The miniature railway, which was fully signalled using Sykes electric banner signals, was particularly popular on Blakesley Fete days. Following Bartholomew's death in 1919, his widow allowed the line to remain and be used by tourists on special occasions. The track was lifted in 1940 after being sold to an estate in Yorkshire.

Routes

Present day 
Nothing remains of the station. A modern bungalow has been across the trackbed and blocks the eastern side of the High Street overbridge. A derelict Blakesley Hall was demolished in 1957, but one of the locomotives, a 4-4-4 tank engine known as "Blacolvesley" and designed by Henry Greenly, was used at a  miniature railway in Haswell Lodge in County Durham, and is now with the Ravenglass and Eskdale Railway.

References

Disused railway stations in Northamptonshire
Former Stratford-upon-Avon and Midland Junction Railway stations
Railway stations in Great Britain opened in 1873
Railway stations in Great Britain closed in 1962
West Northamptonshire District